Eva Hajičová (born 23 August 1935) is a Czech linguist, specializing in topic–focus articulation and corpus linguistics. In 2006, she was awarded the Association for Computational Linguistics (ACL) Lifetime Achievement Award. She was named a fellow of the ACL in 2011.

References

External links 
 Charles University home page

Linguists from the Czech Republic
Women linguists
Academic staff of Charles University
Living people
1935 births
Corpus linguists
Fellows of the Association for Computational Linguistics